The John Copas House is a historic house in the unincorporated community of Copas, Minnesota, United States.  Its original owner was an Italian immigrant who settled the property in the early 1850s and built this house around 1880 to enlarge or replace his previous residence.  The house was listed on the National Register of Historic Places in 1980 for its local significance in the themes of architecture and exploration/settlement.  It was nominated for its association with John Copas, an early settler and leading figure in the community platted in 1857 and ultimately named in his honor.

See also
 National Register of Historic Places listings in Washington County, Minnesota

References

1880 establishments in Minnesota
Houses completed in 1880
Houses in Washington County, Minnesota
Houses on the National Register of Historic Places in Minnesota
Italian-American culture in Minnesota
National Register of Historic Places in Washington County, Minnesota
Queen Anne architecture in Minnesota